The 1988–89 Nationalliga A (Swiss National League A) was contested by 12 teams and won by FC Lucerne.

First stage

Table

Results

Second stage

Championship group

Table

Results

Promotion/relegation group

Group A

Table

Results

Group B

Table

Results

Notes 

 No clubs were relegated or promoted

Sources
 Switzerland 1988–89 at RSSSF

Swiss Football League seasons
Swiss
1988–89 in Swiss football